Penelope and the Humongous Burp is a children's picture book by Sheri Radford and illustrated by Christine Tripp.

Plot
Penelope can't control her burping after she drinks a few glasses of grape soda too quickly.

Reception
A Quill and Quire review says, "With its exuberant pictures, slightly naughty subject matter, silly words ("glurble glooble") and repetitive phrases, Penelope and the Humongous Burp could lead to some comical storytimes."
The book won an award from Canadian Toy Testing Council for Top Ten Books of the Year in 2005.
It was nominated for the Blue Spruce Awards in 2007.

References

2004 children's books
American picture books
Canadian children's books